"I May Never Get to Heaven'" is a song written by Bill Anderson and Buddy Killen, and was originally recorded by Don Gibson in 1960 and released on the B-side of "Just One Time",

Conway Twitty recording
In 1979, the song was recorded by American country music artist Conway Twitty.  It was released in July 1979 as the second single from his album Cross Winds.  The song was Twitty's 22nd number one hit on the country chart.  The song stayed at number one for a single week and spent a total of 10 weeks on the country chart.

Charts

Weekly charts

Year-end charts

Other cover versions
B.J. Thomas released a version in 1968 as the B-side to his Top 40 hit "The Eyes of a New York Woman". 
Wanda Jackson covered it in 1961.
The song was notably covered by Aretha Franklin in 1967, on the album Take It Like You Give It, her final album for Columbia Records before moving to Atlantic Records.

References

1979 singles
1960 songs
Don Gibson songs
Wanda Jackson songs
B. J. Thomas songs
Aretha Franklin songs
Conway Twitty songs
Songs written by Bill Anderson (singer)
Songs written by Buddy Killen
MCA Records singles